Leo Königsberger (15 October 1837 – 15 December 1921) was a German mathematician, and historian of science.  He is best known for his three-volume biography of Hermann von Helmholtz, which remains the standard reference on the subject. 

In 2018, a biography about Helmholtz was written by science historian David Cahan.

Biography 
Königsberger was born in Posen (now Poznań, Poland), the son of a successful merchant. He studied at the University of Berlin with Karl Weierstrass, where he taught mathematics and physics (1860–64). He taught at the University of Greifswald (assistant professor, 1864–66; professor, 1866–69), the University of Heidelberg (1869–75), the Technische Universität Dresden (1875-77), and the University of Vienna (1877–84) before returning to Heidelberg in 1884, where remained until his retirement in 1914.

In 1904 he was a Plenary Speaker of the ICM in Heidelberg. In 1919 he published his autobiography, Mein Leben ('My Life'). The biography of Helmholtz was published in 1902 and 1903. He also wrote a biography of C. G. J. Jacobi.

Königsberger's own research was primarily on elliptic functions and differential equations.  He worked closely with Lazarus Fuchs, a childhood friend.

Selected publications
 Vorlesungen über die Theorie der elliptischen Functionen, nebst einer Einleitung in die allgemeine Functionenlehre
 Vorlesungen über die Theorie der hyperelliptischen Integrale, Teubner 1878, Project Gutenberg
 Allgemeine Üntersuchungen aus der Theorie der Differentialgleichungen
 Lehrbuch der Theorie der Differentialgleichungen mit einer unabhängigen Variabeln
 Zur Geschichte der Theorie der elliptischen Transcendenten in den Jahren 1826–29, Teubner 1879, Project Gutenberg
 Carl Gustav Jacob Jacobi, Teubner 1904.
 
 Mein Leben, Heidelberg 1919. (Erw. Ausgabe. Univ. Heidelberg 2015.)

Notes

References

External links 
 

 Mathematical publications from the University of Heidelberg.
 Extended autobiography (in German) from the University of Heidelberg.
 
 

1837 births
1921 deaths
Scientists from Poznań
Converts to Lutheranism from Judaism
19th-century German mathematicians
People from the Grand Duchy of Posen
Academic staff of the University of Greifswald
20th-century German mathematicians
Historians of science
Members of the Göttingen Academy of Sciences and Humanities